Sarala Virala is a documentary by Ere Gowda released in 2019. The documentary is an insight into a simple man named L Narayan Reddy, who remains steadfast and true to his beliefs in the midst of awards, popularity, wealth, and the materialistic new-age lifestyle. He is an octogenarian organic farmer, imparting knowledge on environment-friendly agriculture gained from decades of practice to people from all walks of life.

Awards
 Bangalore International Film Festival
 66th National Film Awards Best Educational / Motivational / Instructional Film
 Winner Eurasia International Film Festival UK 2019
 Hero and Time International Film Festival of Russia 2019
 Indian Film Festival Stuttgart 2019

References

2010s Kannada-language films
Indian documentaries